The modern constellation Dorado is not included in the Three Enclosures and Twenty-Eight Mansions system of traditional Chinese uranography because its stars are too far south for observers in China to know about them prior to the introduction of Western star charts. Based on the work of Xu Guangqi and the German Jesuit missionary Johann Adam Schall von Bell in the late Ming Dynasty, this constellation has been classified under the 23 Southern Asterisms (近南極星區, Jìnnánjíxīngōu) with the names White Patches Attached (夾白, Jiābái) and Goldfish (金魚, Jīnyú).

The name of the western constellation in modern Chinese is 劍魚座 (jiàn yú zuò), meaning "the swordfish constellation".

Stars
The map of Chinese constellation in constellation Dorado area consists of :

See also
Chinese astronomy
Traditional Chinese star names
Chinese constellations

References

External links
香港太空館研究資源
中國星區、星官及星名英譯表
天象文學
台灣自然科學博物館天文教育資訊網
中國古天文
中國古代的星象系統

Astronomy in China
Dorado (constellation)